José María Isaac Béjar (born 19 September 1985), commonly known as José Mari, is a Spanish footballer who plays as a left back.

Football career
Born in Mérida, Badajoz, Extremadura, José Mari made his senior debuts with CD Alhaurino in the 2004–05 campaign, in Tercera División. On 21 August 2005 he moved to Málaga CF, being immediately loaned to UD Melilla in Segunda División B.

José Mari returned to the Andalusians in June 2006, and was assigned to the reserves also in the third level. He played his first match as a professional on 27 August, starting and being booked in a 1–0 away win against Hércules CF in the Segunda División.

José Mari scored his first professional goal on 9 December, netting the last of a 1–1 draw at UD Vecindario. He appeared in eight matches during the season, as the Andalusians narrowly avoided another drop.

On 20 July 2007 José Mari moved to Polideportivo Ejido, also in the second level. After appearing rarely, he was loaned to Valencia CF Mestalla on 15 January of the following year, until June.

José Mari continued to appear in the third and fourth divisions in the following campaigns, representing Mérida UD, UD Logroñés, Marbella FC (two stints) and Unión Estepona CF.

References

External links
 Marbella official profile 
 
  
 

1985 births
Living people
People from Mérida, Spain
Sportspeople from the Province of Badajoz
Spanish footballers
Footballers from Extremadura
Association football defenders
Segunda División players
Segunda División B players
Tercera División players
Atlético Malagueño players
Málaga CF players
Polideportivo Ejido footballers
Valencia CF Mestalla footballers
UD Logroñés players